C2 or a derivative (C-2, C2, etc.) may refer to:

Mathematics and physics
 C2, one of the common notations for the cyclic group of order 2
 C2 differentiability class
 c2 the square of the speed of light (in the mass–energy equivalence formula)

Biology
 C2 domain, a protein structural domain
 C2 regulatory sequence for the insulin gene
 Apolipoprotein C2, a human apolipoprotein
 In human anatomy, C2 may refer to:
 Cervical vertebra 2, the axis, one of the cervical vertebrae of the vertebral column
 Cervical spinal nerve 2
 Chlorophyll c2, a form of chlorophyll
 Complement component 2
 Procyanidin C2, a plant phenolic compound
 Prodelphinidin C2, a plant phenolic compound
 Vitamin C2, a name sometimes used for Choline
 the ATC code for Antihypertensives, a subgroup of the Anatomical Therapeutic Chemical Classification System
C2 fragments, one of the types of products of catabolism pathways
 Haplogroup C-M217, also known as C2, a Human Y-chromosome DNA haplogroup

Chemistry
 C2, Diatomic carbon, a molecule made of two carbon atoms
 C2=, ethylene, a two carbon alkene

Codes or abbreviations
C2 may be a code or abbreviation for:
 C2 Aquarii, a star
 C2 Centauri, a star
 C2 (Code Geass), an anime character
 C2 explosive, a form of plastic explosive
 C2 pylon, a type of high voltage pylon
 C2 radio class, a class in FM broadcasting in America
 C2 (classification), a para-cycling classification
 Group C2, the secondary class of Group C sports car racing
 BRDC C2 Championship, a short lived sports car racing series which ran from 1988 to 1990
 Nimrod NRA/C2, a 1982 Group C racing car
 C2, an international standard paper size defined in ISO 216 (458×648 mm)
 C2, a level in the Common European Framework of Reference for Languages
 C2, the NRS social grade between C1 and D
 Command and control, the exercise of authority by a commanding officer over military forces in the accomplishment of a mission
 Air Luxor IATA airline code
 C2 Pictures, a film company related to Carolco Pictures
 Bill C-2, various legislation of the Parliament of Canada
 C2, or C2 a note-octave in music, aka Low C

Computing

 C2, a computer security class, defined in the Trusted Computer System Evaluation Criteria
 C2, a bytecode compiler that is part of the HotSpot virtual machine implementation
 C2 (protocol), a 1985 Commodore file transfer protocol
 C2 error, a read error of a compact disc
 C2.com or WikiWikiWeb, the first user-editable website
 Cryptomeria cipher, a cipher used in digital rights management
 Command and control (malware)
 Codec 2, speech compression codec.

Transportation and space
 C2 class Melbourne tram
 Bavarian C II (Ostbahn), an 1862 German steam locomotive
 Bavarian C II.1, an 1857 German steam locomotive
 Bavarian C II.2, an 1861 German steam locomotive
 Chevrolet Corvette (C2), the generation of the Chevrolet Corvette produced between 1962 and 1967
 Citroën C2, a car produced by Citroën in 2004
 Cluster II (spacecraft), an ESA space mission
 GNR Class C2, a British 4-4-2 steam locomotive class
 LNER Class C2, classified C1 during GNR ownership 
 Kawasaki C2, a bike
 London Buses route C2
 LB&SCR C2 class, an 1893 British 0-6-0 steam locomotive
 Circumferential Road 2 or C-2, an arterial road of Manila, Philippines
 Saf-T-Liner C2, a school bus built by Thomas Built Buses
 Saturn C-2, a 1960 conceptual American launch vehicle
 Type C2 ship, a type of all-purpose cargo ship
 C2 (yacht), a luxury motor yacht
 Central Circular Route (Shuto Expressway) in Tokyo, Japan
 Mei-Nikan Expressway, route C2 in Nagoya, Japan

Military and aviation
 C2A1, Squad Automatic Weapon variant of the FN FAL formerly in Canadian Service
 C-2 Greyhound, the Grumman cargo aircraft of the United States Navy
 ACAZ C.2, a Belgian prototype fighter aircraft of the 1920s
 AEG C.II, a German World War II armed reconnaissance aircraft
 AGO C.II, a German reconnaissance biplane of World War I
 Cierva C.2, a 1921 Spanish experimental autogyro 
 DFW C.II, a World War I German reconnaissance aircraft 
 Fokker C-2, the American military version of the Fokker F.VII aircraft
 , a British C class submarine of the Royal Navy
 Kawasaki C-2, a military transport aircraft
 LFG Roland C.II, a 1915 advanced German reconnaissance aircraft
 LVG C.II, a 1910s German two-seat reconnaissance biplane 
 , a C-class submarine of the United States Navy
 , a protected cruiser of the United States Navy
 A military term for Command and control
 C-2 (poison), developed in the Poison laboratory of the Soviet secret services

Other
 C2, UEFA Cup Winners' Cup in football, later merged with UEFA Cup (now UEFA Europa League)
 C2 Pictures, a film studio
 C-2 visa, a nonimmigrant visa which allows individuals to travel to and from the headquarters of the United Nations
 Coca-Cola C2, a soft drink launched by The Coca-Cola Company in 2004

See also
 CO2
 CII (disambiguation)